Wing chord may refer to:

 Wing chord (biology), an anatomical measurement of the wing of birds
 Chord (aeronautics), the width of an aircraft's wing